Walter Trail (died 1401; also spelled Trayl) was a late 14th century Bishop of St. Andrews. He appears as an official in the Bishopric of Glasgow in 1378, as a Magister Artium and a Licentiate in Canon and civil law. In 1380, he has a doctorate in canon and civil law, as well as a Papal chaplain and auditor. In this year, Pope Clement VII (an "anti-Pope") granted him the deanery of the Bishopric of Dunkeld. He became treasurer of the Bishopric of Glasgow in either 1381 or 1382. On 29 November 1385, the Pope provided him to the vacant Bishopric of St. Andrews, vacant because of the capture and death of the previous bishop-elect, Stephen de Pa.

Walter Trail was an active bishop, and ardent defender of the rights of the church within Scotland. Walter constructed the castle at St. Andrews. It was there that he died in 1401.

References
Dowden, John, The Bishops of Scotland, ed. J. Maitland Thomson, (Glasgow, 1912)

14th-century births
1401 deaths
Bishops of St Andrews
14th-century Scottish Roman Catholic bishops
15th-century Scottish Roman Catholic bishops